Antoine François Gilis (1847–1914) was a Belgian musician and composer who composed mainly for the piano and violin. He believed that "above all, the student who starts out learning the piano, should have fun.". To accomplish this, his study pieces are very melodic and increase slowly in difficulty throughout the books as to "stimulate interest". Throughout his books, study pieces are accompanied by easy explanations of music theory.

Several books were published by A. Hammond & Co and Schott & Co around 1910, such as his famous "Méthode de Piano".

List of famous pieces 
 La Jeune Fanfare. Marche facile pour Piano
 Fantaisie Joyeuse. Op. 456. (Violin and Piano)
 Chant d'Adieu. Op. 459. (Violin and Piano)
 Doux Souvenir. Morceau sentimental pour Piano
 Fantaisie Pastorale. Op. 458. (Violin and Piano)
 Fantaisie Mignonne. Op. 457. (Violin and Piano)
 Fantaisie pour Piano sur le Voyage en Chine [by F. E. J. Bazin]
 L'Écho du Soir, morceau de salon pour Piano
 Le Jeune Violoniste. 6 Morceaux tre

References

External links 
 Amazon's list of pieces by Antoine Gilis

External links
 

French Classical-period composers
1781 deaths
1702 births
18th-century classical composers
French male classical composers
18th-century French composers
18th-century French male musicians